Grizzly Peak may refer to:

United States
Grizzly Peak, California,  an unincorporated community
Grizzly Peak (Disney California Adventure), a themed land in a theme park

Mountains 
Grizzly Peak (Berkeley Hills), California

Grizzly Peak (Mariposa County, California)

Grizzly Peak (Dolores County, Colorado), a mountain in Colorado
Grizzly Peak (Gunnison County, Colorado), a mountain in Colorado
Grizzly Peak (La Plata County, Colorado), a mountain in Colorado
Grizzly Peak (Sawatch Range), Colorado
Grizzly Peak (Summit County, Colorado)
Grizzly Peak (Montana), a mountain in Carbon County, Montana
Grizzly Peak (Oregon)

Grizzly Peak (Wyoming), a mountain in Yellowstone National Park

Elsewhere
Grizzly Peak (Antarctica)

See also
Grizzly Mountain (disambiguation)